The Billboard Tropical Songs chart is a chart that ranks the best-performing tropical songs of the United States. Published by Billboard magazine, the data are compiled by Nielsen Broadcast Data Systems based on each single's weekly airplay.

Chart history

See also
 List of number-one Billboard Hot Tropical Songs of 2007
 List of number-one Billboard Hot Latin Songs of 2006
 List of number-one Billboard Hot Latin Pop Airplay of 2006

References

2006
United States Tropical Songs
2006 in Latin music